Wang Yunlong (Chinese:王云龙, Pinyin: Wáng Yúnlóng; born 22 February 1990) is a Chinese football player.

Club career
Wang joined Genbao Football Academy from Liaoning Youth in 2004 with a fee of ¥100,000 and was described by the academy's general manager Xu Genbao as being a hot prospect for the future. Wang was promoted to Shanghai East Asia squad in 2007 for the China League Two campaign. He made an impression within the team as Shanghai East Asia won promotion to the second tier at the end of the season. However, lingering injury kept him out of the field for the next several seasons.

On 2 February 2012, Wang transferred to Chinese Super League side Jiangsu Sainty with a fee of ¥3 million. He made his Super League debut on 10 March, in a 1–1 home draw against Shanghai Shenhua, coming on as a substitute for Sun Ke in the 80th minute. However, he failed to establish himself within the first team and played mostly in the reserve team league. He made just four appearances (30 minutes in total) in the 2012 league season.

Wang transferred to Wuhan Zall who was newly promoting to Super League on 14 December 2012.
In January 2015, Wang transferred to China League One side Inner Mongolia Zhongyou.
On 27 February 2017, Wang transferred to fellow League One side Zhejiang Yiteng.

In March 2018, Wang transferred to China League Two side Suzhou Dongwu.

International career
Wang was called up to play for China U-17, China U-20 and China U-23 between 2005 and 2010. He played for China in the 2006 AFC U-17 Championship, 2008 AFC U-19 Championship and 2010 Asian Games.

Career statistics
.

Honours
Shanghai East Asia
China League Two: 2007

Jiangxi Liansheng
 China League Two: 2014

References

External links
Player profile at Sodasoccer.com 

1990 births
Living people
Sportspeople from Anshan
Chinese footballers
Association football forwards
Footballers from Liaoning
Shanghai Port F.C. players
Jiangsu F.C. players
Wuhan F.C. players
Jiangxi Beidamen F.C. players
Inner Mongolia Zhongyou F.C. players
Zhejiang Yiteng F.C. players
Suzhou Dongwu F.C. players
Chinese Super League players
China League One players
China League Two players
Footballers at the 2010 Asian Games
Asian Games competitors for China